Henri Ludovic Marius Pinta (15 June 1856, in Marseille – 18 October 1944, in Paris) was a French painter who specialized in religious works. He also created designs for mosaics and stained glass windows.

Biography 
He studied with Alexandre Cabanel and Jules Lefebvre. In 1884, he was awarded the Prix de Rome for his depiction of the "oath of Brutus" after the death of Lucretia. From 1885 to 1888, he was a resident at the Villa Médicis in Rome, under the directorship of Ernest Hébert. In 1885, an exhibition was held in Paris, to give the residents an opportunity to show off their work. His choice of subject matter was strange, and some said heretical:  "Christ Weeping Over the Futility of His Sacrifice", in which Jesus was portrayed without divine qualities.

The following year, he presented a "Saint Martha", which was criticized on the grounds that she was too coquettish. In 1887, his "Mass at Bolsena" (after Raphael) was deemed to have been derived from the least interesting part of the original. Finally, in 1888, his rendering of Aurora was rated as mediocre and vulgar. What is, perhaps, his best known work also comes from this period: a portrait of the composer Claude Debussy, who was a resident of the Villa in 1886.

In 1890, he became a member of the Société des Artistes Français and exhibited regularly at the Salon. Notable works from this later period include "Naissance du Jour" (Birth of Day, 1903), which is still widely reproduced, and an unconventional "Sacred Heart", inspired by his sadness over the loss of two sons in the First World War. It was a favorite of Teilhard de Chardin.

He was a life long friend with another painter from Marseille, Alexandre Jean-Baptiste Brun. 

Later, his works became more conventional in style and he concentrated on designs for church decorations. In 1915, he created a mural depicting the death of Saint Joseph for the church of Saint-François Xavier des Missions étrangères. Together with the stained glass maker, he produced designs for windows at the church of Saint Vaast in Béthune and the Basilica of the Sacred Heart in Marseille.

In 1933, he returned with Champigneulle to the Basilica, designing mosaics for the choir that cover 120 square meters (app. 1291 square feet). The project took until 1941 to complete.

References

Further reading 
 Suzanne Arzoumanian-Soulé, Henri Pinta (Marseille 1856-Paris 1944) : Vie et œuvre, Masters Thesis, 2002, Aix-Marseille University.

External links

 "Who Was Henri Pinta?" @ Teilhard's Sacred Heart.
 "Henri Pinta and the Sacred Heart" @ Teilhard's Sacred Heart

1856 births
1944 deaths
19th-century French painters
Religious artists
Artists from Marseille
Mosaic artists
Stained glass artists and manufacturers
Prix de Rome for painting
20th-century French painters